Ridgeport is an unincorporated community in Center Township, Greene County, Indiana.

Ridgeport was named for the ridge upon which the community is situated.

In the early minutes of the film The Effect of Gamma Rays on Man-in-the-Moon Marigolds (1972), a furniture shop's billboard can be seen mentioning Ridgeport.

Geography

References

Unincorporated communities in Greene County, Indiana
Unincorporated communities in Indiana
Bloomington metropolitan area, Indiana